Becker is a city in Sherburne County, Minnesota, between the Mississippi and Elk Rivers. The population was 4,877 at the 2020 census.

Becker is located 46 miles northwest of Minneapolis and 19 miles southeast of St. Cloud. U.S. Highway 10 serves as a main route in Becker.

History
Becker was platted in 1867, and named for George Loomis Becker, a state legislator. A post office called Becker has been in operation since 1870.

Geography

Business
Xcel Energy operates the Sherburne County Generating Station (Sherco) within the city. This plant is the largest coal-fired power plant in Minnesota. The power plant no longer pays its historical share of property taxes; therefore Becker residents pay property taxes similar to those of nearby communities. This changed in 2003.

Becker Minnesota's zip code, 55308, was listed by the Minnesota Pollution Control Agency in 2020 as the state's largest single source of Carbon Dioxide (CO2) equivalent emissions from 'air permitted facilities'. Sherco operator Excel Energy has announced plans to close the plants by the end of the decade.

Google plans to build a data center in Becker, and the company would become one of Xcel Energy's largest customers.

In late February 2020, firefighters responded to a report of a fire at Northern Metals Recycling in Becker. Northern Metals Recycling moved its operations from Minneapolis to Becker the year before, after being ordered to shut down by the Pollution Control Agency due to high levels of air pollution. The fire was reported to have started under a pile of cars. The fire lasted several days, and caused schools to close in order to conduct air quality testing. More than three dozen fire departments were reported to have been on scene. Eventually, it was decided in tandem with the Minnesota Pollution Control Agency and the Minnesota Department of Health that the best course of action would be to let the fire burn out. This decision was also influenced by the fact that water resources were being quickly depleted from Becker and the neighboring vicinity.

Demographics

2010 census
As of the census of 2010, there were 4,538 people, 1,526 households, and 1,164 families residing in the city. The racial makeup of the city was 96.6% White, 0.5% African American, 0.2% Native American, 0.9% Asian, 0.1% Pacific Islander, 0.2% from other races, and 1.6% from two or more races. Hispanic or Latino of any race were 1.7% of the population.

There were 1,526 households, of which 50.6% had children under the age of 18 living with them, 59.7% were married couples living together, 11.6% had a female householder with no husband present, 5.0% had a male householder with no wife present, and 23.7% were non-families. 18.3% of all households were made up of individuals, and 6.7% had someone living alone who was 65 years of age or older. The average household size was 2.93 and the average family size was 3.35.

The median age in the city was 30.7 years. 34.1% of residents were under the age of 18; 7.3% were between the ages of 18 and 24; 32.2% were from 25 to 44; 17% were from 45 to 64; and 9.3% were 65 years of age or older. The gender makeup of the city was 48.2% male and 51.8% female.

2000 census
As of the census of 2000, there were 2,673 people, 929 households, and 728 families residing in the city. The racial makeup of the city was 98.20% White, 0.34% African American, 0.45% Native American, 0.45% Asian, 0.07% from other races, and 0.49% from two or more races. Hispanic or Latino of any race were 0.79% of the population.

There were 929 households, out of which 49.1% had children under the age of 18 living with them, 62.9% were married couples living together, 10.9% had a female householder with no husband present, and 21.6% were non-families. 15.2% of all households were made up of individuals, and 3.7% had someone living alone who was 65 years of age or older. The average household size was 2.88 and the average family size was 3.21.

In the city, the population was spread out, with 34.0% under the age of 18, 10.1% from 18 to 24, 35.7% from 25 to 44, 13.9% from 45 to 64, and 6.3% who were 65 years of age or older. The median age was 28 years. For every 100 females, there were 99.0 males. For every 100 females age 18 and over, there were 99.0 males.

The median income for a household in the city was $50,714, and the median income for a family was $51,940. Males had a median income of $37,038 versus $26,622 for females. The per capita income for the city was $19,333. About 3.4% of families and 4.1% of the population were below the poverty line, including 4.3% of those under age 18 and 3.4% of those age 65 or over.

Government
Becker is represented by Andrew Mathews in the Minnesota Senate and Shane Mekeland in the Minnesota House of Representatives. Both are members of the Republican Party of Minnesota. On a federal level, Becker is located in Minnesota's 6th congressional district, represented by Tom Emmer.

Attractions

Parks
Becker contains nine city parks, including the Becker City Park which sits on over 100 acres. In 2020 a dog park was added onto the City Park.

The other city parks include the Becker Athletic Complex (BAC), the Becker Community Center, Carl E. Johnson park, Kolbinger Park, Pleasant Valley park, River's Edge Park, Snuffy's Landing, and the Tot Lot.

Golf Course
Becker is home to Pebble Creek Golf Course, a 27-hole course which is open to the public.

Public Library
The Becker Public Library is a branch of Great River Regional Library. The library is located within the community center on County Road 23 (Sherburne Avenue).

Transportation
U.S. Highway 10 (co-signed and Minnesota State Highway 25) are the primary highway routes through Becker. U.S. Highway 10 plays a considerable role in the economy of the city, as many of Becker's businesses are located along it.

County Road 23 (Sherburne Avenue) also makes its starting point in Becker.

The proposed extension of the Northstar Commuter Rail to St. Cloud would include a stop in Becker. It is currently served by Northstar Link Commuter Bus between Big Lake and St. Cloud.

Media
Becker is home to one newspaper, the Patriot. Previously the Citizen-Tribune, the Patriot is a self-described "full-service medium to avid readers in Central Minnesota." It is also served by the Saint Cloud Times and the Star Tribune.

Education
Becker is served by the Independent School District 726. The four schools, listed below, have a total enrollment of 2,697 students. Search for Schools and Colleges
 Becker Primary School (K-2)
 Becker Intermediate School (3-5)
 Becker Middle School (6-8)
 Becker High School (9-12)

Sports

Football
The Becker High School Football program was started by Dwight Lundeen in 1970. Coach Lundeen remains the only head coach in the history of the program. The Becker program won the class AAA championship in 2005 and class AAAA championships in 2014 and 2015. They are now currently in class AAAA and in the Mississippi 8 conference. They have 19 conference championships, 14 section championship, 16 state tournament appearances, and have also appeared in seven prep bowls, making Becker Football one of the most successful football programs in Minnesota.

Robotics
Becker is home to FRC 4607 Coalition of Independent Students (CIS) which competes in the FIRST Robotics Competition.

References

External links
Becker - City Website
Sherburne County Citizen - newspaper site 

Cities in Minnesota
Cities in Sherburne County, Minnesota
Minnesota populated places on the Mississippi River